Chorilaena quercifolia, commonly known as karri oak or chorilaena, is a species of bushy shrub that is endemic to the karri forests of south-west Western Australia. It is the sole species in the genus Chorilaena. It has papery, broadly egg-shaped leaves with lobed edges and variously-coloured flowers arranged in umbels of five, the sepals and petals hairy on the outside and the stamens protruding beyond the petals.

Description
At the base of the sepals there are thread-like to spatula-shaped bracts and bracteoles that are about the same length as the flowers. Flowering mainly occurs between October and February.

Taxonomy
Chorilaena quercifolia was first formally described in 1837 by Austrian botanist Stephan Endlicher. The description was published in his book, Enumeratio plantarum quas in Novae Hollandiae ora austro-occidentali ad fluvium Cygnorum et in sinu Regis Georgii collegit Carolus Liber Baro de Hügel, based on plant material collected from King George Sound by Charles von Hügel. The leaves are shaped like those of an oak (genus Quercus), hence the specific epithet quercifolia.

Distribution and habitat
Karri oak grows on rocky coasts and on hillsides within  of the coast between Cape Naturaliste and Bald Island in Western Australia.

Conservation status
This species is listed as "not threatened" by the Government of Western Australia Department of Parks and Wildlife.

References

Sapindales of Australia
Rosids of Western Australia
Monotypic Rutaceae genera
Plants described in 1837
Taxa named by Stephan Endlicher
Zanthoxyloideae
Zanthoxyloideae genera